Evadale is an unincorporated community and census-designated place (CDP) in Jasper County, Texas, United States. The population was 1,246 at the 2020 census.

Geography
Evadale is located in southern Jasper County at  (30.353492, -94.065332). It is bordered to the west by the Neches River, which forms the Hardin County line.

U.S. Route 96 passes through the community, leading northeast  to Buna and west  to Silsbee.

Demographics

As of the 2020 United States census, there were 1,246 people, 555 households, and 374 families residing in the CDP.

As of the census of 2000, there were 1,430 people, 537 households, and 407 families residing in the CDP. The population density was 83.9 people per square mile (32.4/km2). There were 591 housing units at an average density of 34.7 per square mile (13.4/km2). The racial makeup of the CDP was 98.95% White, 0.07% Native American, 0.42% from other races, and 0.56% from two or more races. Hispanic or Latino of any race were 1.82% of the population.

There were 537 households, out of which 36.5% had children under the age of 18 living with them, 64.2% were married couples living together, 8.8% had a female householder with no husband present, and 24.2% were non-families. 20.9% of all households were made up of individuals, and 9.5% had someone living alone who was 65 years of age or older. The average household size was 2.66 and the average family size was 3.10.

In the CDP, the population was spread out, with 29.1% under the age of 18, 8.0% from 18 to 24, 28.3% from 25 to 44, 22.5% from 45 to 64, and 12.1% who were 65 years of age or older. The median age was 34 years. For every 100 females, there were 95.4 males. For every 100 females age 18 and over, there were 92.8 males.

The median income for a household in the CDP was $30,781, and the median income for a family was $36,813. Males had a median income of $33,438 versus $18,333 for females. The per capita income for the CDP was $13,906. About 12.7% of families and 15.6% of the population were below the poverty line, including 19.7% of those under age 18 and 11.8% of those age 65 or over.

Education
Public education in the community of Evadale is provided by the Evadale Independent School District and home to the Evadale High School Rebels. The district made news in June 2015 for refusing to change their Confederate Flag-inspired crest despite pressure to do so.

Climate
The climate in this area is characterized by hot, humid summers and generally mild to cool winters.  According to the Köppen Climate Classification system, Evadale has a humid subtropical climate, abbreviated "Cfa" on climate maps.

References

Census-designated places in Jasper County, Texas
Census-designated places in Texas
Unincorporated communities in Jasper County, Texas
Unincorporated communities in Texas